Alison Standen is an Australian politician. She was elected to the Tasmanian House of Assembly for the Labor Party in the Division of Franklin at the 2018 state election, and served until her defeat in 2021.

She was a health practitioner, a community leader and a public servant before entering politics, and was the Tasmanian Labor Party's first openly gay candidate. Her partner's name is Kate Grady and they have a son.

References

Year of birth missing (living people)
Living people
Australian Labor Party members of the Parliament of Tasmania
Members of the Tasmanian House of Assembly
Women members of the Tasmanian House of Assembly
21st-century Australian politicians
21st-century Australian women politicians
LGBT legislators in Australia
21st-century Australian LGBT people